Siegfried von Ciriacy-Wantrup was a German academic. Born in Langenberg, Germany in 1906. After doing his master's work in Illinois, he returned to Bonn to get his Ph.D. in 1931. In 1936, he left Nazi Germany for the United States, arriving at UC Berkeley and the Department of Agricultural and Resource Economics in 1938.

He died in 1980 at the Men's Faculty Club.

Academic work 
Career highlights:
 Fellow National Academy, IAS, AAAS, AAEA, Rockefeller, Guggenheim
 1952 classic text "Resource Conservation"
 Testified and shaped state and federal conservation policy
 International work on marine resources and other areas
 Studies of Tule Elk, California Condor, Marine Mammals

Wantrup's work on the institutions of natural resource management is neither well-known nor widely cited.

2008 Wantrup Fellow, David Zetland, has a series of blog posts at aguanomics that point out the relevance (and even prescience) of his opinions on the importance of institutions with respect to natural resources.

Of particular interest is Wantrup's notion of three decision levels: At the highest level is basic law (e.g., the constitution), which affects the second-level decisions on how to form institutions (e.g., water organizations). These institutions—in turn—affect third-level decisions of how to allocate water (e.g., among crops or within an urban sector). Wantrup points out that economists who critique decisions at the third level are perhaps missing the importance of constraints or influence coming from the second level. His critique, which dates from the 1960s, is still relevant—economists still spend most of their time on optimal decisions without taking institutions into account. In taking his institutional approach, Wantrup discussed and integrated common property, the impacts of tenure rights on conservation, the Precautionary Principle, conservation land use planning, and the importance of endangered species and biodiversity.

Wantrup derived criteria for sustainability that included the "Safe Minimum Standard" (the threshold below which loss is catastrophic), irreversibility, and unknown future probability (Option Value). He also wrote on the “Extramarket Values” of collective goods.

Legacy 

Ciriacy-Wantrup left a sizable bequest to the University of California that is used to fund the "S.V. Ciriacy-Wantrup Postdoctoral Fellowships in Natural Resource Economics and Political Economy," which are awarded according to the following criteria: For the purposes of this fellowship, natural resources are defined broadly to include environmental resources. The fellowship encourages, but is not limited to, policy-oriented research. Applications are open to scholars from any social science discipline, and related professional fields such as law and planning, who will make significant contributions to research on natural resource economics broadly defined. Preference will be given to proposals whose orientation is broadly institutional and/or historical, and which are conceptually and theoretically innovative.

Four postdoctoral fellowships are awarded each year, for one year with an option to renew (nearly automatic approval) for a second year. Visiting Research Fellowships are awarded for a single year only to academics with PhDs awarded no more than ten years in the past.

The Land Trust of Napa County manages the Wantrup Wildlife Sanctuary that was established in 1982. It is a  oak woodland preserve in Pope Valley where oak reforestation studies and graduate research takes place.

See also 

 Contingent valuation
 Environmental economics
 Institutional economics
 Resource economics

Notes

Publications 

Ciriacy-Wantrup on google scholar

 
 
 
 
 
 
 
 
 
 Siegfried von Ciriacy-Wantrup (dir.)  (1967). Natural Resources: Quality and Quantity, University of California Press (Berkeley) : viii + 217 p.

1906 births
1980 deaths
20th-century American economists
German emigrants to the United States